Frederick Albert Henry Ryder (7 March 1902 – 28 March 1974) was an  Australian rules footballer who played with South Melbourne in the Victorian Football League (VFL).

Notes

External links 

1902 births
1974 deaths
Australian rules footballers from Tasmania
Sydney Swans players
Devonport Football Club players
North Hobart Football Club players